Milan (Cyrillic: Милан) is a common Slavic male name and less commonly, a Roman name. It is derived from the Slavic element mil, with meanings kind, loving, and gracious. Milan was originally a diminutive or nickname for those whose Slavic names began with "Mil-". It is found in Czech Republic, Slovakia, Serbia, Montenegro, Croatia, Bosnia and Herzegovina, Slovenia, North Macedonia, Bulgaria, Poland, and Hungary.  It was in the top 5 names for boys born in Serbia in 2012. It was in the top 20 names for boys born in Slovakia in 2004.  It was the eighth most popular name for boys born in the Netherlands in 2007, and seventh in Flanders in 2009.

Eastern European origin and use
It originates from the Old Slavic word mil, variant: mio, i.e. "beloved", "pleasant", "dear" which is common at the beginning of many Slavic names.

This is the same root in Serbian names like Miloslav, Milomir, Milica, Milka, Miloš, Milutin, Miodrag, Miomir etc. most of which were first recorded in Serbian sources already in the pre-Nemanjić Age.

According to the Czech calendar Milan's Day is on 18 June,
Slovenian calendar: 11 September, 11 October, 12 November,
Croatian calendar: 13 November,
Slovak calendar: 27 November,
Hungary: 19 May

Roman name
Milan is also a name used in Romance-speaking Europe owing to its Ancient Roman meaning of "eager and laborious". The people named like that are named after the Italian city by that name.

Other versions
Men's versions of the name: Milanek (diminutive), Miladin, Milad, Milanko, Milče, Milček, Milči, Milčo, Mile, Milen, Milenko, Miletus, Mili, Milivoj, Milibor, Milidrag, Miligoj, Milija, Milijan, Milinko, Milisav, Milivoj, Milivoje, Milk, Milivojko, Miljan, Miljenko, Miljutin, Milko, Milodrag, Milogoj, Miloje, Milojko, Miloljub, Milomir, Milorad, Miloslav, Miloš, Miłosz, Bogumił, Milovan, Milun, Milutin, Mišo
Female versions of the name: , Milanka, Milena, Milica, Milijana, Miljanka, Milinka, Milislava, Milivoje, Milivojka, Mila, Miljana, Miljanka, Milka, Milojka, Milodraga, Milomirka, Milorad, Milosav, Milosavka, Miloslavka, Miloška, Milovana, Milovanka, Milunka

Family names derived from names
From the name of Milan and its variants a number of surnames were created. The most famous are: Milanović, Milanovac, Milanković, Miłosław, Milanić, Milač, Milavec, Miletić, Milić, Miljković, and others.

People
 Milan I of Serbia, the ruling Prince of Serbia (1868–1882), and later King of Serbia (1882–1889)
 Milan Acquaah (born 1997), American basketball player
 Milan Aleksić, Serbian water polo player, Olympic champion
 Milan, Indian film art director
 Milan the Leather Boy, a New York musician and producer active in the 1960s
 Milan Balažic, Slovene politician and diplomat
 Milan Baroš, Czech football player
 Milan Biševac, Serbian football player
 Milan Begović, Croatian writer
 Milan (drag queen), American drag queen
 Milan Ftáčnik, Slovak politician, former mayor of Slovak capital city of Bratislava
 Milán Füst, Hungarian writer
 Milan Hejduk, Czech ice hockey player
 Milan Hodža, Slovak Prime Minister of Czechoslovakia
 Milan Jayathilaka (born 1981), Sri Lankan politician
 Milan Jovanović, several notable people with this name
 Milan Kangrga, Croatian philosopher
 Milan Karlíček, Czech ice hockey player
 Milan Komar, Slovene philosopher
 Milan Kučan, President of Slovenia
 Milan Kundera, Czech writer
 Milan Lucic, Canadian hockey player
 Milan Máčala, Czech football coach
 Milan Mačvan, Serbian basketball player
 Milan Michálek, Czech ice hockey player
 Milan Mladenović, Serbian musician
 Milan Nedić, Prime Minister of Nazi-occupied Serbia
 Milan Obrenović II, Prince of Serbia
 Milan Pogačnik, Slovenian politician
 Milan Puskar, Serbian-American entrepreneur
 Milan Rapaić, Croatian football player
 Milan Rešetar, Serbian linguist and historian
 Milan Rúfus, Slovak poet
 Milan Rastislav Štefánik, Slovak politician and astronomer, general of French Army
 Milan Stanković, Serbian singer
 Milan Šašik, Slovak bishop
 Milan Šufflay, Croatian historian and politician
 Milan Uzelac, Serbian poet and essayist
 Milan Vaclavik, Slovak military general and defense minister (1985-1989)
 Milan Arambašić, Serbian writer
 Milan Vidmar, Slovene engineer, chess player, and philosopher

Fictional characters
 Milan Hendrickx, a recurring character in the Belgian series wtFOCK.

See also
 Slavic names
 Milano (disambiguation)#People

Notes

Masculine given names
Czech masculine given names
Serbian masculine given names
Croatian masculine given names
Macedonian masculine given names
Slovene masculine given names
Bosnian masculine given names
Bulgarian masculine given names
Hungarian masculine given names
Polish masculine given names
Slovak masculine given names
German masculine given names
Dutch masculine given names
Slavic masculine given names
Swedish masculine given names